I Always Wanted to Be a Gangster is a 2008 French comedy film directed by Samuel Benchetrit.

Cast 
 Anna Mouglalis - Suzy - la serveuse
 Édouard Baer - Gino - le braqueur
 Jean Rochefort - Jean
 Laurent Terzieff - Émile
 Jean-Pierre Kalfon - Max
 Venantino Venantini - Joe
 Roger Dumas - Pierrot la Pince
 Alain Bashung - Alain Bashung
 Arno - Arno
 Bouli Lanners - Léon

References

External links 

2008 comedy films
2008 films
French comedy films
2000s French films